Rhue (An Rubha in Gaelic) is a small settlement north of Ullapool in Ross and Cromarty, and is in the Scottish council area of Highland, Scotland.

Etymology
Rhue derives from An Rubha which means "headland" in Gaelic. The full name of the area is "RudhaCadail" which in Gaelic means "the Point (ie headland) of the Sleepy People". Legend has it that the name came from sailors found asleep but quite unharmed on the rocks (where the lighthouse is now) after their boat was shipwrecked on a stormy night. The settlement is shown on earlier maps as "Ard-a-chadail", the 'village' of the sleepy people.

Populated places in Ross and Cromarty